Amadou Ali (1943 – 27 September 2022) was a Cameroonian politician. Born in Kolofata, he was Minister of Justice since 2001 and a Deputy Prime Minister since 2004. He served as Deputy Prime Minister, Minister Delegate at the presidency in charge of Relations with the Parliament.

From 1974 to 1982 he served as Secretary General of the Ministry of Public Service. From 1982 to 1983, he held the position of Delegate General of Tourism. From 1983 to 1985 he was appointed Delegate General of the National Gendarmerie. He was appointed Secretary of State at the Ministry of Defence on 24 August 1985, and retained the post for 12 years. From 19 September 1996, to 7 December 1997, he held the post of Secretary General at the Presidency cumulatively with his functions as Secretary of State at the Ministry of Defence. He was later appointed Minister Delegate at the Presidency in charge of Defence, serving from 7 December 1997, to 21 April 2001. From 21 April 2001, to 8 December 2004, he held the position of Minister of Justice, with the rank of Minister of State. He was promoted to the position of Vice Prime Minister, while conserving his duties as justice minister, in December 2004. From 2011, he held the position of Deputy Prime Minister, Minister Delegate at the presidency in charge of Relations with the Parliament.

Ali's home in Kolofata was attacked by members of Boko Haram, a violent Islamist group based in northern Nigeria, in late July 2014, and his wife Francoise Agnes Moukouri was abducted. However, a statement from President Paul Biya's office confirmed she was released alongside 27 others, including 10 Chinese construction workers in October 2014.

Ali died on 27 September 2022, aged 79 in Yaoundé.

References

« Les 50 personnalités qui font le Cameroun : Amadou Ali », Jeune Afrique, n° 2520-2521, p. 33
Republic of Cameroon biography

1943 births
2022 deaths
Government ministers of Cameroon
Grand Officiers of the Légion d'honneur
Recipients of the Order of Valour
People from Far North Region (Cameroon)
20th-century Cameroonian politicians
21st-century Cameroonian politicians